James William Bolton (born 13 August 1994) is an English professional footballer who plays as a defender for  side Plymouth Argyle.

Career

Non-league
Born in Stone, Staffordshire, Bolton spent seven years as a youth player at Stoke City. He then joined Macclesfield Town at the age of sixteen.

On 23 August 2012, Bolton and teammate André da Costa were loaned to Workington of the Conference North for a month. The deal was extended until the new year, and he made 14 total appearances, scoring the equaliser in a 2–1 home win over Hinckley United on 29 September.

Bolton was sent out again in December 2012 to Stafford Rangers, signing for a month to the Northern Premier League Premier Division club. He then joined F.C. Halifax Town on loan on 28 March, for the rest of the season. He scored three goals in seven games for the Shaymen, all within seven days in mid-April.

In 2013–14, Bolton made ten Conference National appearances for Macclesfield before being loaned back to Halifax in the same league on 30 January, for the second half of the season. On 2 July 2014, the deal was made permanent for an undisclosed contract length. After being part of the Halifax squad which won the FA Trophy but were also relegated from the National League, he joined Gateshead on a three-year deal in May 2016.

Shrewsbury Town
After one season at Gateshead, Bolton joined League One side Shrewsbury Town in July 2017 for an undisclosed fee, signing a two-year deal. He made his English Football League debut on 5 August in a 1−0 home victory over Northampton Town.

On 29 August, Bolton was sent off for a foul on Jodi Jones as Shrewsbury won 3–2 at Coventry City in the EFL Trophy. He scored his first goal for the Shrews on 27 January 2018, the only one of a win away to Portsmouth. Bolton started in the EFL Trophy Final and League One play-off Final, which his team lost to Lincoln City and Rotherham United respectively at Wembley Stadium.

In the 2018–19 FA Cup third round replay away to his childhood club Stoke, Bolton scored Shrewsbury's first goal as they overturned a 0–2 deficit in the last 19 minutes to win 3–2. He was on target again in the next round's replay at Premier League club Wolverhampton Wanderers, albeit in a 3–2 loss on 5 February.

Portsmouth
On 7 June 2019, Bolton signed for fellow League One team Portsmouth on a free transfer on a three-year deal after turning down an improved contract. He made his debut on 3 August on his return to the New Meadow, as a 53rd-minute substitute for Anton Walkes in a 1–0 loss to Shrewsbury.

Bolton scored his first goal for Pompey on 4 January 2020, opening a 2–1 win at Fleetwood Town in the third round of the FA Cup. On 1 February, he recorded a first league goal in a 2–0 victory over Sunderland at Fratton Park.

Plymouth Argyle
On 24 June 2021, Bolton signed for League One side Plymouth Argyle on a two-year deal for an undisclosed fee.

Personal life
On 21 March 2020, it was reported that Bolton and three Portsmouth teammates had tested positive for COVID-19 during the 2020 pandemic. None were reported to be seriously ill.

Career statistics

Honours
Shrewsbury Town
EFL Trophy runner-up: 2017–18

Portsmouth
EFL Trophy runner-up: 2019–20

References

External links 

1994 births
Living people
People from Stone, Staffordshire
English footballers
Association football defenders
English Football League players
National League (English football) players
Northern Premier League players
Macclesfield Town F.C. players
Workington A.F.C. players
Stafford Rangers F.C. players
FC Halifax Town players
Gateshead F.C. players
Shrewsbury Town F.C. players
Portsmouth F.C. players
Plymouth Argyle F.C. players